Unison is the first home video by Canadian singer Celine Dion, released on VHS on 2 July 1991. It includes the music videos from her English debut album, Unison (1990).

Background
This collection features never before used version of "Calling You," previously unreleased version of Dion's breakthrough hit "Where Does My Heart Beat Now" (Canadian black-and-white version mixed with the US performance version), plus exclusive interviews with Dion at her home.

Three videos: "Délivre-moi," "Have a Heart," and "Calling You" were filmed during the Unison Tour at the Winter Garden Theatre in Toronto, Ontario, Canada, and later shown in the 1991 MusiMax TV special.

In the United States, the US version of "(If There Was) Any Other Way" from 1991 was included; in Canada, the Canadian version from 1990. This VHS was made in both English and in French. The two contain similar interviews conducted in both languages.

Unison home video was certified Gold in Canada on 1 May 1992.

Track listing

Certifications

Release history

References

1991 video albums
Celine Dion video albums
Music video compilation albums